The 2011 Team Long Track World Championship was the fifth annual FIM Team Long Track World Championship. The final took place on 21 August 2011 in Scheeßel, Germany. The Championship was won by the defending champion Germany who beat the Netherlands and Great Britain. It was fifth champion title for German riders.

Results
  Scheeßel, Lower Saxony
 21 August 2011
 Eichenring Scheessel (Length: 1.000 m)
 Referee:  Wojciech Grodzki
 Jury President:  Anthony Steele
 References:

Heat details

See also
 2011 Individual Long Track World Championship
 2011 Speedway World Cup

References

Team Long Track World Championship
Longtrack
Longtrack
Team